The Batang Mukah Bridge or Mukah Bridge is a landmark bridge in Mukah town in Mukah Division, Sarawak, Malaysia.

Bridges in Sarawak